Hosni Abd Rabbo Abdul Muttalib Ibrahim (born 1 November 1984) is an Egyptian footballer manager and a former professional footballer who played as an attacking midfielder.

Hosny was usually deployed as a deep-lying playmaker in midfield for both his club and national sides.

Hosny spent most of his career at his boyhood club Ismaily where he played with the first team for more than 15 seasons. He is also one of the few players to refuse to leave the club to join their rivals Al Ahly.

Hosny also represented the Egypt national team at both youth and senior levels. He was a member of the winning squad of the 2008 and 2010 Africa Cup of Nations and won the Player of the Tournament award in 2008. Hosny was also included in Egypt's 2009 FIFA Confederations Cup squad and played all of his nation's matches during the tournament.

On 16 January 2019, Hosny officially announced his retirement from football at the age of 34.

Club career

Ismaily
Hosny started his professional football career at Ismaily in Egypt, and was the youngest player in the Egyptian first division when Ismaily won the League Championship in the season 2001–02. In 2003, Hosni joined the Egyptian U-20's in the FIFA World Youth Championship 2003 in the Arab Emirates.

At the end of 2003, he played in the Arabian Club Championship final but lost, achieving the same result in the 2003 African Champions League. In 2004 Hosny was selected for the first time in his career to play for the Egyptian national team in the 2004 African Cup of Nations in Tunisia and was one of the youngest players in the tournament.

He re-joined Ismaily in January 2011.

Strasbourg
In summer 2005, Hosny signed a five-year contract with French club RC Strasbourg, for whom he appeared in 22 Ligue 1 matches. He was called up for the Egyptian national team that would participate in the 2006 African Cup of Nations in Egypt, but was injured just one week before the tournament started and could not play. The Egyptian national team eventually went on to win the tournament against Ivory Coast.

Return to Ismaily
In the 2005–06 season, Strasbourg was relegated to Ligue 2. Hosny then left the team on a season loan deal, returning to his original club Ismaily.

Due to his impressive performance with the Egyptian national team in the 2008 African Cup of Nations tournament, he was chosen as Player of the Tournament.

After the loan spell ended, Hosny agreed to extend his stay at Ismaily on a permanent deal due to Strasbourg's failure to achieve promotion to Ligue 1. However, this move did not receive consent from Strasbourg and they decided to sue the player for signing a contract with another club without their consent.

Al-Ahli
On 29 July 2008, it was announced that Hosny had signed a loan deal for two seasons for Emirati club Al-Ahli in Dubai, despite the player having been linked with offers from top European clubs in England and Spain. Ismaily later revealed that the only official offer they received, other than Al-Ahli's offer, was from Spanish club Osasuna.

Immediately after the player's move was made public, officials of the Egyptian Premier League club Al Ahly announced that they intend to sue Hosny for moving to Ahli Dubai, despite having earlier signed a contract for them.

Al Nassr FC
On 2 July 2012, Hosny signed a one-year loan deal with Saudi club Al Nassr FC.

International career
Hosny made his debut for the Egypt national team against Sudan on 6 June 2004. He was called up to the Egyptian national team for the 2006 African Cup of Nations held in Egypt, but was injured one week before the tournament started and was consequently excluded from the tournament squad. As a member of the national team, he won the 2007 Pan Arab Games held in Egypt. He was the key player in the Egyptian team that won the 2008 African Cup of Nations, scoring four goals, making two assists and being named Player of the Tournament.

2008 African Cup of Nations
Hosny scored two goals in the first match against Cameroon, one from a penalty. Hosny also assisted the third goal, which was scored by Abo Trieka.

Career statistics 

Scores and results list Egypt's goal tally first, score column indicates score after each Hosny goal.

Honours 
Ismaily
 Egyptian Premier League: 2001–02

Al Ahli
 UAE Super Cup: 2008
 UAE Football League: 2008–09

Egypt U20
 African Youth Championship: Burkina Faso 2003
 Participated in World Youth Championship (8th place): 2003
 11th Pan Arab Games: 2007

Egypt
 Africa Cup of Nations: 2008, 2010

Individual
 Player of the tournament in the ACN 2008 in Ghana.
 Chosen in the starting XI team of the tournament in the ACN 2008 tournament.
 Best player in CAN 2008.

See also
 List of men's footballers with 100 or more international caps

References

External links
 
 

1984 births
Living people
People from Ismailia
Egyptian footballers
Association football midfielders
Egypt international footballers
FIFA Century Club
2009 FIFA Confederations Cup players
2008 Africa Cup of Nations players
2010 Africa Cup of Nations players
Ligue 1 players
Egyptian Premier League players
RC Strasbourg Alsace players
Al Nassr FC players
Ittihad FC players
Ismaily SC players
Egyptian expatriate footballers
Egyptian expatriate sportspeople in France
Expatriate footballers in France
Egyptian expatriate sportspeople in the United Arab Emirates
Expatriate footballers in the United Arab Emirates
Egyptian expatriate sportspeople in Saudi Arabia
Expatriate footballers in Saudi Arabia